Inverted bell may refer to one of the following:

Inverted bell, a shape
Inverted bell (music), a musical instrument 
Inverted bell curve, in statistics, a bimodal distribution